Pitt-Rivers is an English surname adopted by later holders of the peerage Baron Rivers. Holders of the surname include:

 Horace Pitt-Rivers, 3rd Baron Rivers (1777–1831); born William Beckford, adopted the name on inheriting the title from his brother-in-law George Pitt, 2nd Baron Rivers
 George Pitt-Rivers, 4th Baron Rivers (1810–1866), elder son of Horace (1777–1831)
 Henry Pitt-Rivers, 5th Baron Rivers (1849–1867), son of George (1810–1866)
 Horace Pitt-Rivers, 6th Baron Rivers (1814–1880), younger son of Horace (1777–1831)
The surname was adopted by the ethnologist and archaeologist Augustus Henry Lane-Fox (1827–1900) when he inherited from Horace in 1880. (He was Horace's second-cousin, via a different daughter of George Pitt, 2nd Baron). Augustus Pitt Rivers founded the Pitt Rivers Museum at the University of Oxford. His descendants include:
 George Pitt-Rivers (1890–1966), anthropologist, grandson of Augustus
 Rosalind Pitt-Rivers (1907–1990), physiologist, joint discoverer of the thyroid hormone triiodothyronine, second wife of the above
 Michael Pitt-Rivers (1917–1999), George (1890–1966)'s son, who gained notoriety when put on trial charged with buggery
 Julian Pitt-Rivers (1919–2001), anthropologist and ethnographer, the second son
(George) Anthony Lane Fox Pitt-Rivers (born 1932), third son, who married in 1964 Valerie, who was Lord Lieutenant of Dorset 2006–2014.

Compound surnames
Surnames of English origin